Black River is a northern suburb of Townsville in the City of Townsville, Queensland, Australia..

Geography 
The now-closed Greenvale railway line passed through the locality; there were no stations within the locality.

The Hervey Range Developmental Road runs along the southern boundary.

History
The suburb is named after the Black River which was in turn named after John Melton Black (1830-1919) who was a pastoralist, merchant and a settler of Townsville.

References

External links 

 

Suburbs of Townsville